The Prosperita Open is a professional tennis tournament played on outdoor red clay courts. It is currently part of the Association of Tennis Professionals (ATP) Challenger Tour. It is held annually in Ostrava, Czech Republic, since 2004. In 2004, the tournament was still called Ispat Open.

As of 2022 still nobody has won two singles titles after 19 editions, while Pavel Šnobel and Sergiy Stakhovsky has won two doubles titles each. Stakhovsky won after 13 years from his first win.

Jan Hájek, Stéphane Robert, and Andrey Kuznetsov won both singles and doubles title the same year.

Past finals

Singles

Doubles

External links
Official website

 
ATP Challenger Tour
Clay court tennis tournaments
Tennis tournaments in the Czech Republic
Sport in Ostrava
Recurring sporting events established in 2004